The uterus (from Latin uterus, plural uteri) or womb is the organ in the reproductive system of most female mammals, including humans, that accommodates the embryonic and fetal development of one or more embryos until birth. The uterus is a hormone-responsive sex organ that contains glands in its lining that secrete uterine milk for embryonic nourishment.
 
In the human, the lower end of the uterus is a narrow part known as the isthmus that connects to the cervix, leading to the vagina. The upper end, the body of the uterus, is connected to the fallopian tubes, at the uterine horns, and the rounded part above the openings to the fallopian tubes is the fundus. The connection of the uterine cavity with a fallopian tube is called the uterotubal junction. The fertilized egg is carried to the uterus along the fallopian tube. It will have divided on its journey to form a blastocyst that will implant itself into the lining of the uterus – the endometrium, where it will receive nutrients and develop into the embryo proper and later fetus for the duration of the pregnancy.

In the human embryo, the uterus develops from the paramesonephric ducts which fuse into the single organ known as a simplex uterus. The uterus has different forms in many other animals and in some it exists as two separate uteri known as a duplex uterus.

In medicine, and related professions the term uterus is consistently used, while the Germanic-derived term womb is commonly used in everyday contexts. Events occurring within the uterus are described with the term in utero.

Structure 

In humans the uterus is located within the pelvic region immediately behind and almost overlying the bladder, and in front of the sigmoid colon. A typical adult uterus weighs about 60 grams. The uterus can be divided anatomically into four regions: the fundus – the uppermost rounded portion of the uterus above the openings of the fallopian tubes, the body, the cervix, and the cervical canal. The cervix protrudes into the vagina. The uterus is held in position within the pelvis by ligaments, which are part of the endopelvic fascia. These ligaments include the pubocervical ligaments, the cardinal ligaments, and the uterosacral ligaments. It is covered by a sheet-like fold of peritoneum, the broad ligament.

Layers

The uterus has three layers, which together form the uterine wall. From innermost to outermost, these layers are the endometrium, myometrium, and perimetrium.

The endometrium is the inner epithelial layer, along with its mucous membrane, of the mammalian uterus. It has a basal layer and a functional layer; the functional layer thickens and then is shed during the menstrual cycle or estrous cycle. During pregnancy, the uterine glands and blood vessels in the endometrium further increase in size and number and form the decidua. Vascular spaces fuse and become interconnected, forming the placenta, which supplies oxygen and nutrition to the embryo and fetus.

The myometrium of the uterus mostly consists of smooth muscle. The innermost layer of myometrium is known as the junctional zone, which becomes thickened in adenomyosis.

The perimetrium is a serous layer of visceral peritoneum. It covers the outer surface of the uterus.

Surrounding the uterus is a layer or band of fibrous and fatty connective tissue called the parametrium that connects the uterus to other tissues of the pelvis.

Commensal and mutualistic organisms are present in the uterus and form the uterine microbiome.

Support 

The uterus is primarily supported by the pelvic diaphragm, perineal body, and urogenital diaphragm. Secondarily, it is supported by ligaments, including the peritoneal ligament and the broad ligament of uterus.

Major ligaments  
The uterus is held in place by several peritoneal ligaments, of which the following are the most important (there are two of each):

Axis 
Normally, the human uterus lies in anteversion and anteflexion. In most women, the long axis of the uterus is bent forward on the long axis of the vagina, against the urinary bladder. This position is referred to as anteversion of the uterus. Furthermore, the long axis of the body of the uterus is bent forward at the level of the internal os with the long axis of the cervix. This position is termed anteflexion of the uterus. The uterus assumes an anteverted position in 50% of women, a retroverted position in 25% of women, and a midposed position in the remaining 25% of women.

Position 

The uterus is located in the middle of the pelvic cavity, in the frontal plane (due to the broad ligament of the uterus). The fundus does not extend above the linea terminalis, while the vaginal part of the cervix does not extend below the interspinal line. The uterus is mobile and moves posteriorly under the pressure of a full bladder, or anteriorly under the pressure of a full rectum. If both are full, it moves upwards. Increased intra-abdominal pressure pushes it downwards. The mobility is conferred to it by a musculo-fibrous apparatus that consists of suspensory and sustentacular parts. Under normal circumstances, the suspensory part keeps the uterus in anteflexion and anteversion (in 90% of women) and keeps it "floating" in the pelvis. The meanings of these terms are described below:

The sustentacular part supports the pelvic organs and comprises the larger pelvic diaphragm in the back and the smaller urogenital diaphragm in the front.

The pathological changes of the position of the uterus are:
 retroversion/retroflexion, if it is fixed
 hyperanteflexion – tipped too forward; most commonly congenital, but may be caused by tumors
 anteposition, retroposition, lateroposition – the whole uterus is moved; caused by parametritis or tumors
 elevation, descensus, prolapse
 rotation (the whole uterus rotates around its longitudinal axis), torsion (only the body of the uterus rotates around)
 inversion

In cases where the uterus is "tipped", also known as retroverted uterus, the woman may have symptoms of pain during sexual intercourse, pelvic pain during menstruation, minor incontinence, urinary tract infections, fertility difficulties, and difficulty using tampons. A pelvic examination by a doctor can determine if a uterus is tipped.

Blood, lymph, and nerve supply supply 

The human uterus is supplied by arterial blood both from the uterine artery and the ovarian artery. Another anastomotic branch may also supply the uterus from anastomosis of these two arteries.

Afferent nerves supplying the uterus are T11 and T12. Sympathetic supply is from the hypogastric plexus and the ovarian plexus. Parasympathetic supply is from the S2, S3 and S4 nerves.

Development 

Bilateral Müllerian ducts form during early human fetal life. In males, anti-müllerian hormone (AMH) secreted from the testes leads to the ducts' regression. In females, these ducts give rise to the Fallopian tubes and the uterus. In humans, the lower segments of the two ducts fuse to form a single uterus; in cases of uterine malformations this fusion may be disturbed. The different uterine morphologies among the mammals are due to varying degrees of fusion of the Müllerian ducts.

Various congenital conditions of the uterus can develop in utero. Though uncommon, some of these are didelphic uterus, bicornate uterus and others.

See also List of related male and female reproductive organs.

Function 

The reproductive function of the human uterus is to accept a fertilized ovum, which passes through the uterotubal junction from the fallopian tube. The fertilized ovum divides mitotically to become a blastocyst, which implants into the endometrium and derives nourishment from blood vessels which develop exclusively for this purpose. The fertilized ovum becomes an embryo, attaches to the wall of the uterus, creates a placenta, and develops into a fetus (gestates) until childbirth occurs. Due to anatomical barriers such as the pelvis, the uterus is pushed partially into the abdomen due to its expansion during pregnancy. Even during pregnancy, the mass of a human uterus amounts to only about a kilogram (2.2 pounds).

The uterus also plays a role in sexual response, by directing blood flow to the pelvis,  ovaries, and genitals.

There is also some evidence from rat studies that the uterus plays a role in cognition in a similar way to the ovaries. A study on rat models found that when the uterus was removed, the rats performed more poorly on spatial memory tasks. Prof. Bimonte-Nelson, the co-author of the study, explained: "the body's autonomic nervous system, which regulates 'automated' metabolic processes, such as heart rate, breathing, digestion, and sexual arousal, also has links to the uterus and brain." No similar studies have yet been conducted on humans.

Clinical significance 
During pregnancy the growth rate of the fetus can be assessed by measuring the fundal height.

Some pathological states include:
 

 Accumulation of fluids other than blood or of unknown constitution. One study came to the conclusion that postmenopausal women with endometrial fluid collection on gynecologic ultrasonography should undergo endometrial biopsy if the endometrial lining is thicker than 3 mm or if the endometrial fluid is echogenic. In cases of a lining 3 mm or less and clear endometrial fluid, endometrial biopsy was not regarded to be necessary, but endocervical curettage to rule out endocervical cancer was recommended.
 Hematometra, which is accumulation of blood within the uterus.

 Prolapse of the uterus
 Carcinoma of the cervix – malignant neoplasm
 Carcinoma of the uterus – malignant neoplasm
 Fibroids – benign neoplasms
 Adenomyosis – ectopic growth of endometrial tissue within the myometrium
 Endometritis, infection at the uterine cavity
 Pyometra – infection of the uterus, most commonly seen in dogs
 Asherman's syndrome, also known as intrauterine adhesions, occurs when the basal layer of the endometrium is damaged by instrumentation (e.g., D&C) or infection (e.g., endometrial tuberculosis) resulting in endometrial scarring followed by adhesion formation that partially or completely obliterates the uterine cavity
 Myometritis – inflammation of the muscular uterine wall.

Malformations

Uterine malformations are mainly congenital malformations, and include uterus didelphys, bicornuate uterus and septate uterus. Congenital absence of the uterus is known as Müllerian agenesis.

Surgery
A hysterectomy is the surgical removal of the uterus which may be carried out for a number of reasons including the ridding of tumours both benign and malignant. A complete hysterectomy involves the removal of the body, fundus, and cervix of the uterus. A partial hysterectomy may just involve the removal of the uterine body while leaving the cervix intact. It is the most commonly performed gynecological surgical procedure.

Other animals
Most animals that lay eggs, such as birds and reptiles, including most ovoviviparous species, have an oviduct instead of a uterus. However,  recent research into the biology of the viviparous (not merely ovoviviparous) skink Trachylepis ivensi has revealed development of a very close analogue to eutherian mammalian placental development.

In monotremes, mammals which lay eggs, namely the platypus and the echidnas, either the term uterus or oviduct is used to describe the same organ, but the egg does not develop a placenta within the mother and thus does not receive further nourishment after formation and fertilization.

Marsupials have two uteri, each of which connect to a lateral vagina and which both use a third, middle "vagina" which functions as the birth canal. Marsupial embryos form a choriovitelline placenta (which can be thought of as something between a monotreme egg and a "true" placenta), in which the egg's yolk sac supplies a large part of the embryo's nutrition but also attaches to the uterine wall and takes nutrients from the mother's bloodstream. However, bandicoots also have a rudimentary chorioallantoic placenta, similar to those of placental mammals.

The fetus usually develops fully in placental mammals and only partially in marsupials including kangaroos and opossums. In marsupials the uterus forms as a duplex organ of two uteri. In monotremes such as the platypus, the uterus is duplex and rather than nurturing the embryo, secretes the shell around the egg. It is essentially identical with the shell gland of birds and reptiles, with which the uterus is homologous.

In mammals, the four main forms of the uterus are: duplex, bipartite, bicornuate and simplex.
 Duplex There are two wholly separate uteri, with one fallopian tube each. Found in marsupials (such as kangaroos, Tasmanian devils, opossums, etc.), rodents (such as mice, rats, and guinea pigs), and lagomorpha (rabbits and hares).
 Bipartite The two uteri are separate for most of their length, but share a single cervix. Found in ruminants (deer, moose, elk etc.), hyraxes, cats, and horses.
 Bicornuate The upper parts of the uterus remain separate, but the lower parts are fused into a single structure. Found in dogs, pigs, elephants, whales, dolphins, and tarsiers, and strepsirrhine primates among others.
 Simplex The entire uterus is fused into a single organ. Found in higher primates (including humans and chimpanzees). Occasionally, some individual females (including humans) may have a bicornuate uterus, a uterine malformation where the two parts of the uterus fail to fuse completely during fetal development.

Two uteri usually form initially in a female and usually male fetus, and in placental mammals they may partially or completely fuse into a single uterus depending on the species. In many species with two uteri, only one is functional. Humans and other higher primates such as chimpanzees, usually have a single completely fused uterus, although in some individuals the uteri may not have completely fused.

Additional images

See also 
 Menopause
 Artificial uterus
 Social uterus
 Unicornuate uterus
 Uterus-like mass

References

External links 

  – "The Female Pelvis: Organs in the Female and male Pelvis in situ"
 Encyclopedia.com
 Uterus Anatomy
 Uterus Pregnancy

 
Organs (anatomy)
Pelvis
Mammal female reproductive system
Human female reproductive system
Women's health